In enzymology, a sn-glycerol-3-phosphate 2-alpha-galactosyltransferase is an enzyme that catalyzes the chemical reaction

UDP-galactose + sn-glycerol 3-phosphate  UDP + 2-(alpha-D-galactosyl)-sn-glycerol 3-phosphate

Thus, the two substrates of this enzyme are UDP-galactose and sn-glycerol 3-phosphate, whereas its two products are UDP and 2-(alpha-D-galactosyl)-sn-glycerol 3-phosphate.

This enzyme belongs to the family of glycosyltransferases, specifically the hexosyltransferases.  The systematic name of this enzyme class is UDP-galactose:sn-glycerol-3-phosphate 2-alpha-D-galactosyltransferase. Other names in common use include floridoside-phosphate synthase, UDP-galactose:sn-glycerol-3-phosphate-2-D-galactosyl transferase, FPS, UDP-galactose, sn-3-glycerol phosphate:1->2' galactosyltransferase, floridoside phosphate synthetase, and floridoside phosphate synthase.

References

 

EC 2.4.1
Enzymes of unknown structure